Age Scotland is a registered charity in Scotland, formed on 1 April 2009 by the merger of Help the Aged in Scotland and Age Concern Scotland.

Scotland's largest charity for older people operated under its joint legacy brands as "Age Concern and Help the Aged in Scotland" until the new brand launched in April 2010 It also works interdependently with charities for the nations called Age Cymru, Age NI and Age UK.

Remit
The charity aims to act in partnership with others as the national older people's charity for Scotland in promoting a better quality of life for the nation's older people through:

 Campaigning and influencing on identified issues of concern, ensuring that older people's voices are heard at local authority, Holyrood and Westminster levels, as well as globally through lobbying and campaigning activities and strategic partnerships.
 Supporting older people through the Age Scotland helpline, a phone information service available to over 50s, and through factsheets and downloadable information from its website.
 Working with local older people's groups across Scotland to help build stronger communities through its development staff and grants programme.

Structure

Age Scotland was formed through the merger between Age Concern Scotland and Help the Aged in Scotland, creating an organisation with a combined income of over £3 million.

James Wright was appointed as the chair of the board of trustees in 2009. Prior to his appointment, he was a trustee of Age Concern Scotland and was a chair of Age Concern England. He has served on many public bodies, including health authorities, the Scottish Higher Education Funding Council, and the Heritage Lottery Fund.  He is currently a trustee of Age UK.

History

Age Scotland came into being as a result of the April 2010 merger of Age Concern Scotland and Help the Aged in Scotland, charities with a combined 90 years of independent operations in Scotland.

Age Concern Scotland developed out of several Older People's Welfare Associations founded in 1944 during the Second World War.

Help the Aged in Scotland was established in 1986, when UK charity Help the Aged, founded in 1961, set up a permanent office with a staff in Edinburgh.

Both charities worked throughout Scotland to support a wide network of older people's groups and forums, which in turn provide local responsive services to older people in their own communities.

Age Concern Scotland offered a range of services directly, piloting programmes and working with members and drawing on local needs, expertise, and volunteers as appropriate to develop locally based provision, while Help the Aged in Scotland was considered more as a campaigning and lobbying organisation.

The two charities collaborated on many issues and contributed to the 2002 introduction of Free Personal and Nursing Care and the implementation of the Adult Support and Protection Act in 2007.

A joint campaign in 2005 led to the Burt Review of Council Tax, the report "A Fairer Way" the following year and the eventual freezing of the tax in Scotland for several years.

Currently Age Scotland's focus is on integrating health and social care, fuel poverty and isolation.

Fundraising

Age Scotland's income is funded through corporate partnerships, legacies, fundraising events, individual donors, public funding, 14 charity shops around Scotland and its social enterprise arm, Age Scotland Enterprises.

Age Scotland Enterprises

Age Scotland Enterprises offers products and services that are designed to either address market failure and/or meet its objective of offering products that provide value for money – for example, none of its insurance products have upper age limits.

Operating as a social enterprise, the current product range offered by Age Scotland Enterprises includes: travel, home and motor insurance (provided by Ageas Insurance Limited); motor breakdown cover (provided by Europ Assistance Holdings Limited); gas and electricity (provided by E.On); funeral plan; wills and legal services; and personal alarms.

References

External links
Age Scotland website

Charities for the elderly based in the United Kingdom